The 2017 Adrian Flux British FIM Speedway Grand Prix was the sixth race of the 2017 Speedway Grand Prix season. It took place on 22 July at the Principality Stadium in Cardiff, Wales.

Riders 
First reserve Peter Kildemand replaced Nicki Pedersen, who was injured and not fit to race. The Speedway Grand Prix Commission also nominated Craig Cook as the wild card, and Adam Ellis and Josh Bates both as Track Reserves.

Results 
The Grand Prix was won by Poland's Maciej Janowski, who beat Jason Doyle and Matej Žagar in the final. It was the second successive win for Janowski, who moved to joint-second in the overall standings with compatriot Patryk Dudek - three points behind Doyle. Bartosz Zmarzlik had initially top scored in the heats with 13 points, but he was excluded in the final.

Heat details

Intermediate classification

References

See also 
 Motorcycle speedway

Great Britain
Speedway Grand Prix
Sports competitions in Cardiff
Speedway Grand Prix
Speedway Grand Prix of Great Britain